Gostling is a surname. Notable people with the surname include:

John Gostling (1644–1733), English singer
Mildred May Gostling (1873–1962), English chemist
William Gostling (1696–1777), English clergyman and antiquary

See also
Göstling an der Ybbs
Gosling (disambiguation)